East Des Moines Township is a township in 
Mahaska County, Iowa, USA. Commonly known as "East Village".

References

Mahaska County, Iowa
Townships in Iowa